Terry Dobson birthname Walter Norton Dobson III (1937–1992) was an American aikido pioneer, aikido teacher, and writer, who studied directly with the founder of aikido, Morihei Ueshiba, as one of the first, small handful of non-Japanese to do so.

Early life 
Born in Cambridge, Massachusetts to a wealthy family on June 9, 1937 and moving to New York City in 1940, Dobson had a tumultuous childhood. Raised by his alcoholic mother and stepfather, he did not meet his real father, who had been disgraced after it was discovered that he forged his degree to get into Harvard Business School, until his late teens.

Terry went to the Buckley School and then Deerfield Academy, both prestigious private schools, where he excelled at American football. After receiving a scholarship to play at Franklin & Marshall, he quickly failed out and trained for a summer with the New York Football Giants under Vince Lombardi, the line coach at the time.  He was a US Marine doing helicopter maintenance during the Lebanon crisis of 1958, and attended New York University for a brief period. In 1959 he went to Japan to assist in rural development and teach English.

Discovering aikido 
During a visit to Tokyo, Dobson witnessed a demonstration of what was then the little-known martial art aikido on an American military base in Yokohama.  He instantly fell in love with the art and six months later entered the Aikikai Hombu Dojo as an uchi-deshi (live-in student), and trained as uchi-deshi until his marriage in 1964.  He was one of only two non-Japanese to enjoy this privilege during that early era, the other being André Nocquet.  He continued to train at the Hombu Dojo until Ueshiba's death in 1969.

Spreading Aikido in the US 
In 1970 Dobson returned to the US where he gave seminars around the country and with Ken Nisson co-founded Bond Street Dojo in New York City and Vermont Aikido in Burlington, Vermont. In 1979 he moved to San Francisco, California and became involved with Robert Bly and his Mythopoetic men's movement, still teaching aikido as a visiting sensei.

Death
In 1984 he became ill with what was misdiagnosed as sarcoidosis and moved to Vermont to recover. His teaching trailed off and eventually stopped as he became weaker and weaker.  After a change in medication his health improved and he started teaching again in Vermont. Though not fully healthy, he flew to California to give a Men's Conference and teach aikido in 1992. After teaching a class in San Francisco, he fell into a coma. On August 2, 1992, he died in an ambulance in Inverness, California of a heart attack. Dobson is survived by his daughter Marion, son Daniel, and partner Riki Moss.

Books 

 A novel based on the writings and recordings of Terry Dobson

References

American aikidoka
1937 births
1992 deaths
Buckley School (New York City) alumni
Deerfield Academy alumni